Chile participated in the 2015 Parapan American Games.

Medalists

|align="left" valign="top"|

|align="left" valign="top"|

|align="left" valign="top"|

Competitors
The following table lists Chile's delegation per sport and gender.

Athletics

Chile sent five male and three female athletes to compete.

Men

Field events

Women

Football 5-a-side

Chile sent a team of eight athletes to compete:

Mauricio Beltran Caceres
Esteban Campos Arriagada
Benjamin Cruz Valdivieso
Matias Montenegro
Fernando Opazo Campos
Emiliano Rios Palmilla
Erik Rodriguez Cisternas
Victor Silva Pavez
Sebastian Vergara Herrera
Renato Villagra Sanchez

Preliminary Round

Powerlifting

Chile sent five male and two female athletes to compete.

Swimming

Chile sent four male and five female swimmers to compete.

Men

Women

Table tennis

Chile sent eight male and two female table tennis players to compete.

Men

Women's

Wheelchair rugby

Chile sent a team of twelve athletes to compete.

Alexis Barraza Jara
Andres Bisello Fuentes
Alejandro Duran Vicencio
Cristopher Flores Galdames
Christian Madariaga Dallez
Carlos Novoa Matus
Andres Opazo Guerra
Juan Rodriguez Reyes
Jose Ruiz Soto
Victor Saiz Bocaz
Pedro Silva Rojas
Jose Venegas Penailillo

Preliminary Round

Fifth Place Match

Wheelchair tennis

Chile sent two male and two female athletes to compete.

See also
Chile at the 2016 Summer Olympics
Chile at the 2015 Pan American Games

2015 in Chilean sport
Nations at the 2015 Parapan American Games
Chile at the Pan American Games